William Cameron Menzies (July 29, 1896 – March 5, 1957) was an American film production designer (a job title he invented) and art director as well as a film director and producer during a career spanning five decades. He began his career during the silent era, and later pioneered the use of color in film for dramatic effect.

Early years
Menzies was born in New Haven, Connecticut, to Scots immigrant parents, Charles A. and Helen originally from Aberfeldy, Scotland. He studied at Yale and the University of Edinburgh and, after serving in the United States Army during World War I, he attended the Art Students League of New York.

Career
Menzies joined Famous Players-Lasky, later to evolve into Paramount Pictures, working in special effects and design. He soon worked on such films as Robin Hood (1922), The Thief of Bagdad (1924), The Bat (1926), The Dove (1927), Sadie Thompson (1928), and Tempest (1928). His contributions  to The Dove (1927), as well as Tempest (1928) lead to Menzies receiving the first Academy Award for Best Production Design, an accolade for achievement in art direction. In 1929, Menzies formed a partnership with producer Joseph M. Schenck to create a series of early sound short films visualizing great works of music, including a 10-minute version of Dukas's The Sorcerer's Apprentice, and created the production design and special effects for Schenck's feature film The Lottery Bride (1930).

Menzies's work on The Adventures of Tom Sawyer (1938) prompted David O. Selznick to hire him for Gone with the Wind (1939). Selznick's faith in Menzies was so great that he sent a memorandum to everyone at Selznick International Pictures who was involved in the production reminding them that "Menzies is the final word" on everything related to Technicolor, scenic design, set decoration, and the overall look of the production. His work on the film would also net Menzies an honorary academy award for production design.

"Production designer" (which is sometimes used interchangeably with "art director") was coined specifically for Menzies, to refer to his being the final word on the overall look of the production; it was intended to describe his ability to translate Selznick's ideas to drawings and paintings from which he and his fellow directors worked.

Menzies was the director of the burning of Atlanta sequence in Gone with the Wind. He also re-shot the Salvador Dalí dream sequence of Alfred Hitchcock's Spellbound (1945).

In addition, Menzies directed dramas and fantasy films. He made two science-fiction films: Things to Come (1936), based on a novel by H.G. Wells, for producer Alexander Korda which predicted war and technical advancement; and Invaders from Mars (1953), which mirrored many fears about aliens and outside threats to humanity in the 1950s.

Death
Shortly after completing his work as an associate producer on Around the World in 80 Days (1956), Menzies died of cancer. He was interred in the Forest Lawn Memorial Park Cemetery in Glendale, California.

Accolades
At the first Academy Awards, held on May 16, 1929, Menzies won for Best Art Direction  for The Dove and Tempest. He was the first to win the Academy Award for art direction. The following year he was nominated in the same categories for his work on Bulldog Drummond, Alibi, and The Awakening, but lost to Cedric Gibbons.

At the 12th Academy Awards held on February 29, 1940, Menzies won an Academy Honorary Award "for outstanding achievement in the use of color for the enhancement of dramatic mood" in the production of Gone With the Wind.

Legacy
In 2005, Menzies was in the first group of art directors and production designers inducted into the Art Directors Guild Hall of Fame.

Several of Menzies home movies are part of the collection of the Academy Film Archive and were preserved by the archive in 2015.

Silent Films, 1918-1930

{| class="wikitable sortable"
|-
! style="width: 4em;" | Year
! Title
! Studio
! Director
! class="unsortable" | Photography
! class="unsortable" | Notes
|-
! 1917 (released 4 November)
| The Mark of Cain
| Astra Film/Pathé
| George Fitzmaurice
| Arthur C. Miller
| Menzies assistant to "Settings" director Anton Grot
|-
! 1918 (released 24 February)
| The Naulahka
| Astra Film/Pathé
| George Fitzmaurice
| Arthur C. Miller
| Menzies set associate to Anton Grot
|-
! 1918 (released 27 January)
| Innocent
| Astra Film Corp/Pathé
| George Fitzmaurice
| Percy Hilburn
| With Anton Grot; Menzies joined the U.S. Navy before the film's completion.
|-
! 1919 (released 6 April)
| The Test of Honor
| Famous Players-Lasky/Paramount Pictures
| John S. Robertson
| Jacques Monteran
| Menzies reports this "a movie I have staged" (uncredited)
|-
! 1919 (released 27 April)
| Redhead
| Select Pictures Corp./Select Film Corp.
| Charles Maigne
| Al Liguori
| Menzies reports this "a movie I have staged." (uncredited)
|-
! 1919 (released 11 May)
| Come Out of the Kitchen
| Famous Players-Lasky/Paramount Pictures
| John S. Robertson
| Jacques Monteran
| Menzies reports this "a movie I have staged." (uncredited)
|-
! 1919 (released 22 June)
| The Avalanche
| Famous Players-Lasky/Artcraft Pictures
| George Fitzmaurice
| Arthur C. Miller
| Fitzmaurice is credited with set design. Menzies’ reports "staging" the picture. (uncredited)
|-
! 1919 (released 6 July)
| The Firing Line
| Famous Players-Lasky/Paramount Pictures-Artcraft
| George Fitzmaurice
| Al Liguori
| Menzies reports this "a movie I have staged." (uncredited)
|-
! 1919 (released 14 July)
| His Wedding Night
| Select Pictures Corp./Select Pictures Corp.
| George Fitzmaurice
| Jacques Monteran
| Menzies reports this "a movie I have staged." (uncredited)
|-
! 1919 (released 17 August)
| A Society Exile
| Famous Players-Lasky/Artcraft Pictures
| George Fitzmaurice
| Arthur C. Miller
| Menzies reports this "a movie I have staged." (uncredited)
|-
! 1919 (released 6 July)
| The Misleading Widow
| Famous Players-Lasky/Paramount Pictures-Artcraft
| John S. Robertson
| Roy Overbaugh
| Menzies reports this "a movie I have staged." (uncredited)
|-
! 1919 (released 7 September)
| The Witness for the Defense
| Famous Players-Lasky/Paramount Pictures-Artcraft
| George Fitzmaurice
| Hal Young
| Menzies credited for "Settings"
|-
! 1919 (released 2 November)
| The Teeth of the Tiger
| Famous Players-Lasky/Paramount Pictures-Artcraft
| Chet Withey
| Al Liguori
| Menzies credited for "Settings"
|-
! 1919 (released 21 December)
| His Wife's Friend
| Thomas H. Ince/Paramount Pictures-Artcraft
| Joseph De Grasse
| John S. Stumar
| Menzies reports this "a movie I have staged [art direction]." (uncredited)
|-
! 1920 (released 15 March)
| Sinners
| Realart Pictures Inc./Realart Pictures Inc.
| Kenneth Webb
| George Folsey
| Menzies reports this "a movie I have staged [art direction]." (uncredited)
|-
! 1920 (released April)
| Dr. Jekyll and Mr. Hyde
| Famous Players-Lasky/Paramount Pictures-Artcraft
| John S. Robertson
| Roy Overbaugh
| Menzies provided a draft summary for the film.(uncredited)
|-
! 1920 (released 2 May)
| The Deep Purple
| Mayflower Photoplay Company/Realart Pictures Inc.
| Raoul Walsh
| Jacques Bizeul
| Menzies credited for "Settings"
|-
! 1921 (released March)
| Scrambled Wives
| Margaret Clark Productions/First National Pictures
| Edward H. Griffith
| William McCoy, Ray June
| Menzies reports this "a movie I have staged [art direction]." (uncredited)
|-
! 1921 (released April)
| The Oath
| Mayflower Photoplay Corp/Associated First National
| Raoul Walsh
| Dal Clawson
| Menzies credited for "Settings"
|-
! 1921 (released August)
| Serenade
| R.A.Walsh Productions/Associated First National
| Raoul Walsh
| George Peters
| Menzies credited for "Settings"
|-
! 1922 (released 27 February)
| Kindred of the Dust
| R.A.Walsh Productions/Associated First National
| Raoul Walsh
| Charles Van Enger, H. Lyman Broening
| Menzies credited for "Settings"
|-
! 1923 (released 27 February)
| Rosita
| Mary Pickford Company/United Artists
| Ernst Lubitsch
| Charles Rosher
| Menzies credited as "Art Director"
|-
! 1924 (released 18 March)
| The Thief of Bagdad
| Douglas Fairbanks| Pictures/United Artists
| Raoul Walsh
| Arthur Edeson
| Menzies credited as "Art Director"
|-
! 1924 (released 26 October)
| The Only Woman
| Joseph M. Schenck Productions/First National Pictures
| Sidney Olcott
| Antonio Gaudio
| Menzies credited for "Settings"
|-
! 1924 (released 27 October)
| Her Night of Romance
| Norma Talmadge Production Corporation/First National Pictures
| Sidney Franklin
| Ray Binger, Victor Milner
| Menzies credited for "Art Direction"
|-
! 1925 (released 8 February)
| The Lady
| Joseph M. Schenck Productions/First National Pictures
| Frank Borzage
| Antonio Gaudio
| Menzies credited for "Settings"
|-
! 1925 (released 25 January)
| Learning to Love
| Norma Talmadge Production Corporation]]/First National Pictures
| Sidney Franklin
| Victor Milner
| Menzies credited for "Settings"
|-
! 1925 (released 2 August)
| Her Sister from Paris
| Norma Talmadge Production Corporation/First National Pictures
| Sidney Franklin
| Arthur Edeson
| Menzies credited as "Art Director"
|-
! 1925 (released 30 August)
| Graustark
| Joseph M. Schenck Productions/First National Pictures
| Dimitri Buchowetzki
| Gaetana Gaudio
| Menzies credited for "Settings"
|-
! 1925 (released 4 September)
| The Dark Angel
| Samuel Goldwyn Productions/First National Pictures
| George Fitzmaurice
| George Barnes
| Menzies credited for "Settings"
|-
! 1925 (released 8 November)
| The Eagle
| Art Finance Corporation/United Artists]
| Clarence Brown
| George Barnes
| Menzies credited for "Settings"
|-
! 1925 (released 30 November)
| Cobra
| Ritz-Carlton Pictures/Paramount Pictures
| Joseph Henabery
| George Barnes
| Menzies credited for "Settings"
|-
! 1926 (released 1 February)
| The Wanderer
| Famous Players-Lasky/Paramount Pictures
| Raoul Walsh
| Victor Milner
| Menzies credited for "Settings"
|-
! 1926 (released 14 March)
| The Bat
| Famous Players-Lasky/Paramount Pictures
| Roland West
| Arthur Edeson
| Menzies credited for "Settings"
|-
! 1926 (released 4 April)
| Kiki
| Joseph M. Schenck Productions/First National
| Clarence Brown
| Oliver Marsh
| Menzies credited for "Settings"
|-
! 1926 (released 9 July)
| The Son of the Sheik
| Feature Productions/United Artists
| George Fitzmaurice
| George Barnes
| Menzies credited for "Settings"
|-
! 1926 (released 22 August)
| Fig Leaves
| 20th Century Fox
| Howard Hawks
| Joseph August
| Menzies and William S. Darling credited for "Settings" Menzie’s contribution was only to the Garden of Eden sequence at opening of the picture.
|-
! 1926 (released 5 September)
| The Duchess of Buffalo
| Talmadge Production Corporation/First National Pictures
| Sydney Franklin
| Oliver Marsh
| Menzies credited as "Art Director"
|-
! 1927 (released 27 March)
| The Beloved Rogue
| Feature Productions/United Artists
| Alan Crosland
| Joseph August
| Menzies credited as "Art Director"
|-
! 1927 (released 20 March)
| Venus of Venice
| Talmadge Production Corporation/First National Pictures
| Marshall Neilan
| George Barnes
| Menzies credited as "Art Director"
|-
! 1927 (released 21 April)
| Camille
| Joseph M. SchenckProductions/First National Pictures
| Fred Niblo
| Oliver Marsh
| Menzies credited as "Art Director"
|-
! 1927 (released 16 June)
| Topsy and Eva
| Feature Productions/United Artists]
| Del Lord, D. W. Griffith (uncredited)
| John W. Boyle
| Menzies credited as "Art Director"
|-
! 1927 (released 23 September)
| Two Arabian Knights
| The Caddo Company/United Artists
| Lewis Milestone
| Antonio Guidio, Joseph August (uncredited)
| Menzies credited as "Art Director"
|-
! 1927 (released 12 November)
| Sorrell and Son
| Joseph M. Schenck Productions/First National Pictures
| Herbert Brenon
| James Wong Howe
| Menzies credited as "Art Director"
|-
! 1927 (released 31 December)
| Quality Street
| Joseph M. Schenck Productions/First National Pictures
| Sydney Franklin
| Hendrik Sartov
| Menzies uncredited, but designed the film’s Green Willow Village on the M-G-M lot.
|-
! 1927 (released 31 December)
| The Dove
| Joseph M. Schenck Productions/First National
| Roland West
| Oliver Marsh
| Menzies credited for "Settings"
|-
! 1928 (released 7 January)
| Sadie Thompson
| Gloria Swanson Productions, Inc./United Artists
| Raoul Walsh
| Oliver Marsh
| Menzies credited as "Art Director"
|-
! 1928 (released 22 January)
| What Price Beauty?
| S. George Ulman Productions/Pathe
| Tom Buckingham
| J.D. Jennings
| Menzies credited as "Art Director"
|-
! 1928 (released 4 February)
| Drums of Love
| Feature Productions/United Artists
| D. W. Griffith
| Karl Struss, G.W. Bitzer
| Menzies credited for "Settings"
|-
! 1928 (released 24 January)
| "The Garden of Eden| Feature Productions/United Artists
| Lewis Milestone
| John Arnold (Technicolor sequence)
| Menzies credited as "Art Director"
|-
! 1928 (showing 9 May)
| The Love of Zero| Florey-Menzies Productions/(first Los Angeles showing)
| Robert Florey
| Edward Fitzgerald
| Menzies credited with "Staging"
|-
! 1928 (released 8 July)
| Drums of Love]| Feature Productions/United Artists
|John W. Considine Jr.
| Charles Rosher
| Menzies credited as "Art Director"
|-
! 1928 (released 11 August)
| The Woman Disputed| Joseph M. Schenck Productions/United Artists
| Henry King, Sam Taylor
| Oliver Marsh
| Menzies credited as "Art Director"
|-
! 1928 (released 12 October)
| The Battle of the Sexes| Art Cinema Corporation/United Artists
| D. W. Griffith
| Karl Struss, G.W. Bitzer
| Menzies credited for "Settings"
|-
! 1928 (released 3 November)
| Revenge| Edwin Carewe Productions/United Artists
| Edwin Carewe
| Albert Kurrie, Alfred E. Green
| Menzies credited as "Art Director"
|-
! 1928 (released 17 November)
| The Awakening| Samuel Goldwyn Productions/United Artists
| Victor Fleming
| George Barnes
| Menzies credited as "Art Director""
|-
! 1929 (released 12 January)
| The Rescue| Samuel Goldwyn Productions/United Artists
| Herbert Brenon
| George Barnes, Joseph F. Biroc
| Menzies credited as "Art Director""
|-
! 1929 (released 16 February)
| Lady of the Pavements| Art Cinema Corporation/United Artists
| D. W. Griffith
| Karl Struss, G.W. Bitzer
| Menzies credited for "Settings" Released in an 8-reel silent version
|-
! 1928 (released 30 March)
| Coquette| Mary Pickford Film Corporation]/United Artists
| Sam Taylor
| Karl Struss
| Menzies credited for "Settings"; silent version planned, Pickford cancelled it
|-
! 1929 (released March)
| Alibi| Feature Productions/United Artists
| Roland West
| Ray June
| Menzies credited as "Art Director""; released in 8-reel silent version
|-
! 1929 (released 12 January)
| This is Heaven| Samuel Goldwyn Productions/United Artists
| Alfred Santell
| George Barnes, Gregg Toland
| Menzies credited as "Art Director""
|-
! 1929 (released 3 August)
| Bull Drummond| Samuel Goldwyn Productions/United Artists
| F. Richard Jones
| George Barnes, Gregg Toland
| Menzies credited for "Settings""; released in 7-reel silent version
|-
! 1929 (released 15 September)
| Three Live Ghosts| Feature Productions/United Artists
| Thornton Freeland
| Robert Planck
| Menzies credited as "Art Director""
|-
! 1929 (released 5 October)
| Impressions of Tchaikovsky's Overture 1812| Feature Productions/United Artists
| Hugo Riesenfeld (producer)
| Karl Struss
| Menzies credited with "Pictorial Effects"
|-
! 1929 (released 26 October)
| The Taming of the Shrew| Mary Pickford Corporation, Elton Corporation/United Artists
| Sam Taylor
| Karl Struss
| Menzies credited as "Art Director"
|-
! 1929 (released 16 November)
| The Locked Door| Feature Productions/United Artists
| George Fitzmaurice
| Ray June
| Menzies credited with "Settings"
|-
! 1929 (released March)
| Condemned| Samuel Goldwyn Productions/United Artists
| Wesley Ruggles
| George Barnes
| Menzies credited with "Settings"; also released in an 8-reel silent version
|-
! 1929 (released 14 December)
| Irish Fantasy| Feature Productions/United Artists
| Orville O. Dull
| Paul Perry
| Menzies credited as "Producer" (with Hugo Riesenfeld)
|-
! 1929 (28 December)
| New York Nights| Joseph M. Schenck Productions/United Artists
| Lewis Milestone
| Ray June
| Menzies credited as "Art Director""; released in 8-reel silent version
|-
! 1930 (released 18 January)
| Lummox| Feature Productions/United Artists
| Herbert Brenon
| Karl Struss
| Menzies credited with "Settings"
|-
|}

Sound Era: 1930-1955

Stage Chronology

DVD release
In October 2009, Alpha Video released the public domain collection The Fantastic World of William Cameron Menzies on DVD, which included four early experimental films created by Menzies and Joseph M. Schenck, shorts that visualize great works of classical music:
 "Irish Fantasy" (1929)
 "Impressions of Tschaikowsky's Overture '1812'" (1930)
 "Hungarian Rhapsody" (1930)
 Paul Dukas' "The Wizard's Apprentice" (1930).

According to Dave Kehr, The Wizard's Apprentice "clearly influenced Disney's version in Fantasia.

See also
 Art Directors Guild Hall of Fame

Footnotes

References
Curtis, James. (2015). William Cameron Menzies: The Shape of Films to Come'', Pantheon Books,

External links

 William Cameron Menzies: The Shape of Films to Come, by James Curtis, Knopf Doubleday Publishing Group, Nov 17, 2015

1896 births
1957 deaths
Academy Honorary Award recipients
Alumni of the University of Edinburgh
American art directors
Art Students League of New York alumni
Best Art Direction Academy Award winners
Artists from New Haven, Connecticut
American production designers
English-language film directors
Science fiction film directors
American people of Scottish descent
United States Army soldiers
United States Army personnel of World War I
Burials at Forest Lawn Memorial Park (Glendale)
Film directors from Connecticut